V-2 rocket facilities  may refer to:
V-2 rocket facilities of World War II used by Nazi Germany
Krupp artillery range used for the post-war British Operation Backfire tests
White Sands Proving Ground, the western United States post-war test facility
Kapustin Yar, the post-war USSR test facility
Cape Canaveral, the post-war facility for a few of the last US test launches (e.g., the Bumper rocket)
USS Midway (CV-41), the aircraft carrier used for Operation Sandy near Bermuda